Traveller's Rest, also known as the General Horatio Gates Home, is an historic plantation house located on Bowers Road near Kearneysville, Jefferson County, West Virginia.  Built in 1773 and enlarged a few years later, it was the home of Continental Army General Horatio Gates from 1773 until 1790.  The house is very little altered from that period, and was designated a National Historic Landmark in 1972.  The house is located on private property, and is not normally open to the public.

Description
The main house, a -story stone structure, is set well back on the north side of the road. The eastern section was built by the Hyatt family in a side hall plan, with the western added by Gates a few years later in 1773. The eastern section is a -story structure over a full basement, with a gable roof. It measures about 34 feet wide and 30 feet deep. The western section is also a -story structure with a full basement and measures about 16 feet wide and 30 feet deep. The elevation is seven bays wide.

History

Horatio Gates, a native of England, served in the British Army during the French and Indian War, but was prevented from advancement after the war by a lack of money or political connection.  Gates and his family sailed from England to Virginia in 1772 and bought  on the Potomac River near Shepherdstown in what is now West Virginia. He built this limestone house and became a slave owner, a local justice, and a lieutenant colonel in the militia.  When the American Revolutionary War broke out, Gates helped organized the Continental Army, and went on to become of its more controversial generals, gaining the important victory at Saratoga in 1777 and a humiliating loss at Camden in 1780.  After the war, Gates returned to Traveller's Rest.  In 1790, he sold the home, freed his slaves and moved to New York City.

Gates employed John Ariss for interior woodwork, at a time when Ariss was working on nearby projects for the Washington family. Gates added to the original four-bay structure ashlar masonry, appending a three-bay random rubble stone extension. The dormers were added after Gates' tenure.

The only major documented alteration to the house after the period of Gates ownership is the addition of dormers to the gabled roof.

See also
List of National Historic Landmarks in West Virginia
National Register of Historic Places listings in Jefferson County, West Virginia

References

External links

National Historic Landmarks in West Virginia
Houses on the National Register of Historic Places in West Virginia
Houses in Jefferson County, West Virginia
Georgian architecture in West Virginia
National Register of Historic Places in Jefferson County, West Virginia
Houses completed in 1773
Historic American Buildings Survey in West Virginia
Colonial architecture in West Virginia
John Ariss buildings
Plantation houses in West Virginia
1773 establishments in Virginia